Ernesto José "E. J." Viso Lossada (born March 19, 1985) is a Venezuelan professional racing driver. He has raced in the 2005 and 2006 GP2 Series seasons, and has also driven the third car for Spyker MF1 Racing. In 2007 he competed in the GP2 Series for Racing Engineering. In 2014 he made his season debut for the Stadium Super Trucks in the Long Beach Grand Prix. He most recently drove for Andretti Autosport in the IndyCar Series.

Career

Early racing
Born in Caracas, Viso spent time in his early career in both Europe and America. He attended Rolling Hills Prep high school in California. Viso's career started in karting back in 1993, where he stayed until 2001 when he moved to US Barber Formula Dodge East, becoming champion with confidence. He also raced in the Italian Formula Renault Winter Series at the end of that year, moving to British Formula Renault for 2002. In 2002 he also drove in one race of Formula Renault 2000 Eurocup, and at the end of the year in the British Formula 3 Winter Series.

2003 saw a move to British Formula 3, where he raced in the B-Class and became champion after a controversial collision with his main rival during the final race of the season. He then moved to the main class in 2004, racing part of the season for the P1 team, his performances attracting the attention of F3000 team Durango who lured him to the series for the remainder of the season.

GP2
In 2005, he raced in the inaugural season of the GP2 Series for the BCN Competicion team, alongside Hiroki Yoshimoto. In 2006, he again raced in the GP2 Series for the iSport team. He won the San Marino Sunday race and the Spain Sunday race. He also drove the third Spyker MF1 Team car in the Friday practice sessions of the Brazilian Grand Prix.

Before the 2007 French Grand Prix, it was confirmed that Ernesto Viso would replace the underperforming Sérgio Jimenez at Racing Engineering. His race ended on the first lap in a spectacular collision with Michael Ammermüller and Kazuki Nakajima in which his car somersaulted over the barriers at tremendous speed, smashing through an advertising hoarding and narrowly missing a bridge (as luck would have it, hitting the board saved him from clouting the bridge and probably more severe injuries), leaving him only a severe concussion and painful arm. This crash was very similar to the one of Marco Campos that happened on the same track in 1995, leading to Campos's death. Campos died of severe head trauma after hitting his head on the concrete barrier. Viso was only inches away from the same fate. For the British round, he was replaced by Filipe Albuquerque. Viso took part in the following race meeting, but was then replaced by Marcos Martinez.

IndyCar Series

Viso competed in the newly united IndyCar Series in 2008 for HVM Racing. He made his first series start in the first oval race of his career on March 29. His next start, at St. Petersburg, was a superb performance ending with a fourth-place finish. At Milwaukee he ended with an eighth place. Shortly after the Watkins Glen race (in which he finished 10th but forced Vítor Meira off the track, causing Meira to run back onto the track to confront Viso on the next lap) he was diagnosed with the Mumps and was forced to withdraw from the next race. Viso finished 18th overall in the 2008 series and has signed a contract to drive for HVM in 2009. On February 21, 2010 KV Racing confirmed that Viso would drive the No. 8 car for the team for the entire 2010 season.

For the 2011 IndyCar campaign, Viso remained with KV Racing. He showed flashes of speed, particularly in Brazil where he was in contention for a win. He remained one of the more accident-prone drivers in the series, which led to questions about his seat for 2012 . Viso finished 18th in the IZOD IndyCar Series championship on the strength of four top-10 finishes with a season best seventh place showing in Texas Race No. 2.

For 2013 Viso remained in the IndyCar Series with Andretti Autosport, in the No. 5 with sponsorship from oil company PDVSA, recording a best finish of 4th at Milwaukee and finishing 15th in the final points standings. 

In 2014, Viso no longer had an IndyCar Series drive.

Stadium Super Trucks

In 2014, Viso made his Stadium Super Trucks series debut in Long Beach, California where he finished 2nd after a last lap battle with series founder Robby Gordon. On May 30, Viso got his first ever win in an SST on only his second ever series appearance at the Detroit Belle Isle Grand Prix, where he finished 1st ahead of Robby Gordon in an eventful last lap finish. Viso also captured his second win a day later beating 16-year-old Scotty Steele. Viso swept all three Detroit events on June 1, and won race 1 at Coronado. The Venezuelan finished fifth in the season standings.

Racing record

Complete International Formula 3000 results
(key) (Races in bold indicate pole position; races in italics indicate fastest lap.)

Complete GP2 Series results
(key) (Races in bold indicate pole position) (Races in italics indicate fastest lap)

Complete Formula One participations
(key)

American open–wheel racing results
(key) (Races in bold indicate pole position)

IndyCar Series

 1 Run on same day.
 2 Non-points-paying, exhibition race.
 3 Pulled out of race after contracting mumps
 4 The Las Vegas Indy 300 was abandoned after Dan Wheldon died from injuries sustained in a 15-car crash on lap 11.
 5 Missed race after falling ill due to eating bad oysters. Replaced by Carlos Muñoz.

Indianapolis 500

Complete American Le Mans Series results

Complete WeatherTech SportsCar Championship

Stadium Super Trucks
(key) (Bold – Pole position. Italics – Fastest qualifier. * – Most laps led.)

 The race was abandoned after Matt Mingay suffered serious injuries in a crash on lap three.

References

External links

Official website
IndyCar Driver Page

1985 births
Living people
Sportspeople from Caracas
Venezuelan racing drivers
IndyCar Series drivers
Indianapolis 500 drivers
International Formula 3000 drivers
GP2 Series drivers
British Formula Three Championship drivers
Formula Renault Eurocup drivers
Karting World Championship drivers
24 Hours of Daytona drivers
WeatherTech SportsCar Championship drivers
X Games athletes
Stadium Super Trucks drivers
Manor Motorsport drivers
ISport International drivers
Starworks Motorsport drivers
HVM Racing drivers
Andretti Autosport drivers
KV Racing Technology drivers
Racing Engineering drivers
Durango drivers
P1 Motorsport drivers
OAK Racing drivers
Fortec Motorsport drivers